An election to Cambridgeshire County Council took place on 4 June 2009 as part of the 2009 United Kingdom local elections. The election was delayed from 7 May to coincide with elections to the European Parliament. 69 councillors were elected from 60 electoral divisions, which returned either one or two county councillors each by first-past-the-post voting. The Conservative Party retained their majority on the council, while the Green Party and UKIP gained their first seats.

All locally registered electors (British, Irish, Commonwealth and European Union citizens) who were aged 18 or over on Thursday 4 June 2009 were entitled to vote in the local elections. Those who were temporarily away from their ordinary address (for example, away working, on holiday, in student accommodation or in hospital) were also entitled to vote in the local elections, although those who had moved abroad and registered as overseas electors cannot vote in the local elections. It is possible to register to vote at more than one address (such as a university student who had a term-time address and lives at home during holidays) at the discretion of the local Electoral Register Office, but it remains an offence to vote more than once in the same local government election. The next election was scheduled for and held on 2 May 2013.

Summary
In Cambridge, the Labour Party lost two seats, to the Green Party in Abbey and to the Liberal Democrats in King's Hedges. The Conservatives, despite improving their vote in many electoral divisions and coming second citywide, failed to gain any seats. South Cambridgeshire saw three seats change hands from Conservatives to Liberal Democrats, including in Hardwick which the Liberal Democrats had held since a by-election in 2008. In East Cambridgeshire however, the Conservatives gained four seats from the Liberal Democrats, with Labour fielding candidates in several electoral divisions they did not contest in 2005. There was no change in representation from Fenland, where Conservatives won every seat. In Huntingdonshire, Liberal Democrats lost a seat to Conservatives in St Neots Eaton Socon and Eynesbury, but gained one in Godmanchester and Huntingdon East, a two-member division which subsequently had split representation. The election in the Ramsey electoral division was delayed until 23 July 2009 due to the death of one of the candidates. The election in that division was won by the United Kingdom Independence Party.

Results

|}
Note: the election in the Ramsey electoral division, previously held by the Conservative Party, was delayed until 23 July 2009 due to the death of one of the candidates. The election in that division was won by the United Kingdom Independence Party.

Party strength by electoral division
The following maps show the percentage of the vote each party obtained by electoral division. A colour key for each map can be viewed by clicking on the image.

Results by electoral division

Cambridge (14 seats)

East Cambridgeshire (9 seats)

Fenland (11 seats)

Huntingdonshire (19 seats)

South Cambridgeshire (16 seats)

References

Cambridgeshire County Council elections
2009 English local elections
2000s in Cambridgeshire